Sally Bishop may refer to:

 Sally Bishop, a Romance, a 1910 novel by the British writer E. Temple Thurston
 Sally Bishop (1916 film), a British silent film adaptation of the novel, directed by George Pearson
 Sally Bishop (1924 film), a British silent film adaptation directed by Maurice Elvey
 Sally Bishop (1932 film), a British romantic drama film adaptation directed by T. Hayes Hunter